The Reform Group was a political party in Finland between 1998 and 2001.

History
The party first contested national elections in 1999, when they received 1.1% of the vote in the parliamentary elections, winning a single seat. In the presidential elections the following year, the party nominated Risto Kuisma as their candidate. However, he received just 0.6% of the vote.

The party did not contest any further elections.

Ideology 
The party's mission statement is "to build a just society". It aims to achieve full employment through a job guarantee. It also calls for reductions in income taxes, especially on low income taxpayers, making society "family-centered", and animal welfare.

See also 
 List of Social Democratic Party (Finland) breakaway parties

References

External links
  

1998 establishments in Finland
2001 disestablishments in Finland
Defunct political parties in Finland
Left-wing parties
Political parties established in 1998
Political parties disestablished in 2001
Socialist parties in Finland